The National Mining Association (NMA) is a United States trade organization that lists itself as the voice of the mining industry in Washington, D.C. NMA was formed in 1995, and has more than 300 corporate members.

History
The National Mining Association was created in 1995. The organization was formed through the merger of the National Coal Association (NCA) and the American Mining Congress (AMC). These two organizations had represented the mining industry since 1897 (AMC) and 1917 (NCA).

Mission and objectives
The NMA's mission is "to create and maintain a broad base of political support for the mining industry and to help the nation realize the economic and national security benefits of America's domestic mining capability."

The objective of the NMA is "to engage in and influence the public policy process on the most significant and timely issues that impact our ability to locate, permit, mine, process, transport and utilize the nation's vast coal and mineral resources."

The NMA serves its membership through the following actions:
Promoting the production and use of coal and mineral resources produced by the U.S. mining industry; 
Establishing a political presence in the Nation's Capital on behalf of NMA's membership; 
Serving as an information center for and a single voice of the U.S. mining industry ; and 
Addressing the current and future needs of the industry, mining equipment manufacturers and support services members of the association.

Legislation

Supported
Preventing Government Waste and Protecting Coal Mining Jobs in America (H.R. 2824; 113th Congress) - is a bill that would amend the Surface Mining Control and Reclamation Act of 1977 to require state programs for regulation of surface coal mining to incorporate the necessary rule concerning excess spoil, coal mine waste, and buffers for perennial and intermittent streams published by the Office of Surface Mining Reclamation and Enforcement on December 12, 2008. The National Mining Association supported the bill, with its President, Hal Quinn, saying "this bill accomplishes the important task sometimes lacking in public policy: it balances the needs of the economy with the needs of the environment."

See also
Advocacy Campaign Team for Mining

Notes

External links
Organizational website
Minerals Make Life
CORESafety
Count on Coal
http://www.futurecoalfuels.org/

Mining trade associations
Mining in the United States
1995 establishments in the United States
Organizations established in 1995
Trade associations based in the United States